Armando Leonel Olmedo Pérez (born 8 April 1981) is a Mexican former footballer who last played as a defender for Atlético San Luis.

Career
Although he made his Primera Division debut with his hometown's Club América, Olmedo spent most of his playing career with San Luis F.C. and its replacement club Atlético San Luis. He played for eight seasons over three different spells and is considered a club legend.

After he retired from playing football, Olmedo became a coach. He managed Atlético San Luis (women)'s reserve side before a spell as a caretaker manager of the Liga MX Femenil side in January 2022.

References

External links
 

1981 births
Footballers from Mexico City
Living people
Association football defenders
Liga MX players
Club América footballers
San Luis F.C. players
C.D. Veracruz footballers
Irapuato F.C. footballers
Querétaro F.C. footballers
Mexican footballers